Anders Torsten Martin Jarl (born 10 March 1965) is a Swedish former cyclist. He won the bronze medal in the team time trial road race along with Jan Karlsson, Michel Lafis and Björn Johansson in the 1988 Summer Olympics.

References

1965 births
Living people
Swedish male cyclists
Cyclists at the 1988 Summer Olympics
Olympic cyclists of Sweden
Olympic medalists in cycling
Olympic bronze medalists for Sweden
Medalists at the 1988 Summer Olympics
People from Tyresö Municipality
Sportspeople from Stockholm County
20th-century Swedish people
21st-century Swedish people